Thulimbah is a rural town and locality in the Southern Downs Region, Queensland, Australia. In the  the locality of Thulimbah had a population of 319 people. It borders New South Wales.

Geography 
Thulimbah is located on the Darling Downs. The town is on the New England Highway,  from the state capital, Brisbane.

History
The name of the town derives from the name of the railway station used from 1883, meaning "place of water" in an Aboriginal language.

Bentinck State School opened on 28 September 1914. On 30 August 1916 it was renamed Thulimbah State School. A preschool was added in 1976.

There was originally another district in Queensland called Thulimbah, which was a source of confusion to many people. Eventually the problem was resolved in 1916 by renaming the other district Barney View (due to its location beside Mount Barney).

In the  the locality of Thulimbah had a population of 319 people.

Economy

Thulimbah is a fruit-growing area, including apples, pears, cherries, grapes and oranges for both table and wine-making. There are a number of wineries, many with cellar door outlets in the area. Other local food producers also offer tastings, sales and cafe menus.

Attractions

The town is home to one of Australia's big things, a tourist attraction known as the "Big Apple".

References

External links

 
 

Towns in Queensland
Towns in the Darling Downs
Southern Downs Region
Localities in Queensland